Tornolo is a comune (municipality) in the Province of Parma in the Italian region Emilia-Romagna, located about  west of Bologna and about  southwest of Parma. 

Tornolo borders the following municipalities: Albareto, Bedonia, Borzonasca, Compiano, Mezzanego, Santo Stefano d'Aveto, Varese Ligure.

References

Cities and towns in Emilia-Romagna